The Venerable Hugh Robinson,  D.D. was an Anglican priest in the  first half of the 17th  century.

GRobinson  was  born in Anglesey and educated at New College, Oxford. He held livings at Caerhun, Dursley Trefriw and Bighton. Robinson was Archdeacon of Gloucester from 1634 until his death on 30 March 1655.

Notes 

1655 deaths
Alumni of New College, Oxford
Archdeacons of Gloucester
17th-century English Anglican priests
People from Anglesey